Trimazosin is a sympatholytic alpha-1 blocker.

References

Alpha-1 blockers
Carbamates
Phenol ethers
Piperazines
Quinazolines